Lapanthus is a genus of flowering plants belonging to the family Bromeliaceae.

Its native range is Minas Gerais (Brazil).

Species:

Lapanthus duartei 
Lapanthus itambensis

References

Bromelioideae
Bromeliaceae genera